Chatcolet is an unincorporated community in Benewah County, Idaho, United States. Chatcolet is located on the western shore of Chatcolet Lake in Heyburn State Park.

History
Chatcolet's population was 101 in 1960.

References

Unincorporated communities in Benewah County, Idaho
Unincorporated communities in Idaho